Allan D'Arcangelo (June 16, 1930 – December 17, 1998) was an American artist and printmaker, best known for his paintings of highways and road signs that border on pop art and minimalism, precisionism and hard-edge painting, and also surrealism. His subject matter is distinctly American and evokes, at times, a cautious outlook on the future of this country.

Biography
Allan D'Arcangelo was born in Buffalo, New York to Italian immigrant parents. He studied at the University at Buffalo from 1948 to 1953, where he got his bachelor's degree in history. After college, he moved to Manhattan and picked up his studies again at the New School of Social Research and the City University of New York. At this time, he encountered Abstract Expressionist painters who were in vogue at the moment. After joining the army in the mid 1950s, he used the GI Bill to study painting at Mexico City College from 1957 to 1959, driving there over 12 days in an old bakery truck retrofitted as a camper.

However, he returned to New York in 1959, in search of the unique American experience. It was at this time that his painting took on a cool sensibility reminiscent of Roy Lichtenstein and Andy Warhol. However, throughout his life, D'Arcangelo remained politically active-and this is evident in his painting, though not necessarily in an overt way. His interests engaged with the environment, anti-Vietnam War protests, and the commodification and objectification of female sexuality. Through his painting and writings, it is clear that D'Arcangelo had a palpable discomfort with the social mores of his time, which can be read in the detached treatment with which he treated his subjects.

D'Arcangelo first achieved recognition in 1962, when he was invited to contribute an etching to The International Anthology of Contemporary Engraving: America Discovered; his first solo exhibition came the next year, at the Thibaud Gallery in New York City. In 1965 he contributed three screenprints to Original Edition's 11 Pop Artists portfolio. By the 1970s, D'Arcangelo had received significant recognition in the art world. He was well known for his paintings of quintessentially American highways and infrastructure, and in 1971 was commissioned by the Department of the Interior to paint the Grand Coulee Dam in Washington state.

However, his sense of morality always trumped his interest in art world fame. In 1975, he decided to quit the gallery that had been representing him for years, Marlborough Gallery, because of the way they handled Mark Rothko's legacy. This ultimately sealed his fate of exclusion in the art establishment. He retired to a farm in Kenoza Lake with his family, where he continued to paint and even make earth works. Because of this move, D'Arcangelo's legacy is perhaps less well known than it could have been. He was considered a figure who straddled the lines between many styles of art and was hard to categorize. His cool, pop-like sensibility also met with the usual crisis concerning art movements in the contemporary art world; usually, art movements only last a decade and are then replaced with a new style. However, he did return to the city to continue teaching at Brooklyn College from 1973 to 1992 and the School of Visual Arts from 1982–1992, where he had also previously taught from 1963–1968. Finally, he died in 1998 in New York City due to complications with leukemia.

Artistic style

D'Arcangelo rejected Abstract Expressionism, though his early work has a painterly and somewhat expressive feel. He quickly turned to a style of art that seemed to border on Pop Art and Minimalism, Precisionism and Hard-Edge painting. Evidently, he didn't fit neatly in the category of Pop Art, though he shared subjects (women, signs, Superman) and techniques (stencil, assemblage) with these artists. To D'Arcangelo, his style was less important than the subject matter he depicted and he believed that a culture of protest and resistance was more meaningful than any aesthetic concerns. And the subject he chose to explore first and foremost was the American experience. At first he touched on specific motifs in the contemporary American consciousness, such as President Kennedy's tragic death in Place of Assassination (1965) and environmental concerns in Can Our National Bird Survive? (1962). However, he quickly turned to expansive, if detached scenes of the American highway. These paintings are reminiscent of Chirico-though perhaps not as interested in isolation-and Dali-though there is a stronger interest in the present and disinterest in the past. These paintings also have a sharp quality that is reminiscent of the precisionist style, or more specifically, Charles Sheeler. These paintings also show a deep interest in the contradictions of flatness and perspective as represented on a canvas-ideas that, likewise, artists of the Middle Ages and early Renaissance pondered often. Overall, D'Arcangelo makes an effort at distilling his subject matter into its most honest, intelligible, and synoptic descriptions; his paintings are interpretations of the American experience, not just his own memories.

1950s
Before D'Arcangelo returned to New York, his style was roughly figurative and reminiscent of folk art.

Early 1960s

During the early 1960s, Allan D'Arcangelo was linked with Pop Art. "Marilyn" (1962) depicts an illustrative head and shoulders on which the facial features are marked by lettered slits to be "fitted" with the eyebrows, eyes, nose and mouth which appear off to the right in the composition. In "Madonna and Child," (1963) the featureless faces of Jackie Kennedy and Caroline are ringed with haloes, enough to make their status as contemporary icons perfectly clear. Aside from film stars and icons from pop culture, D'Arcangelo also turned to political matters. His well known painting, Can Our National Bird Survive (1962) was painted the same year Rachel Carson published her seminal Silent Spring; its ambiguity also allows the viewer to interpret it as a statement about the Vietnam War.

Late 1960s

By the mid 1960s, D'Arcangelo had abandoned figurative elements and turned to the American landscape, or, more specifically, the highway. D'Arcangelo is better known for his pictures of highways and roadblocks, which pictured deep perspectival vistas in a simplified, flat plane, the view as seen from the driver's seat as one zooms along the seemingly never-ending American highway in most any state.  He was initially interested in painting these scenes in a series, like a film strip, as the view changes outside your car window. In these paintings, the artist treats every single object with the same quality-both the same flatness and lack of extreme detail. This reads as detached; D'Arcangelo sought to investigate our separation from the natural world, which become more of a symbol than a description in these paintings. He was actually critiqued for these paintings as much as he was celebrated; pop art was considered a flat style, lacking perspectival plays of space. However, he argued that despite the receiving lines of roads, the paintings ultimately were flat. In fact, these works are full of contrasts and contradictions: the flat surface has deep linear perspective; though there are recognizable motifs present, they are highly schematized; and, abstract designs are mixed with recognizable objects, such as trees.

1970s

Next came a series "Barriers," in which cropped, abstracted imagery of road barriers were superimposed over the one-point perspectival highway vistas. These were a move further towards concern with abstract, two-dimensionality without negating the element culled from seen aspects of the American landscape. The series called "Constellation" (there are 120 in all) further abstracted the view of road barriers into perspectival, jutting patterns thrusting across the canvas against a white ground. The element of the seen is never obliterated and always primary in D'Arcangelo's dialectic, as amply evidenced in his return to highway imagery in the 1970s. Though works from these two series appear abstract, D'Arcangelo still referred to them as landscapes because they generate the same sense of endless space and forces the space of the canvas to move between flatness and depth.

Late 1970s and early 1980s

For several years during that decade, D'Arcangelo slowed down his formerly prolific output. He sheds highway motifs completely and turns, instead, to cropped views of buildings and other structures, containers, and views outside of an airplane. In the Spring of 1982, he had his first one-man exhibition in New York in five years. The new pictures were rather scenic landscape vistas, simplified and showing his ongoing concern with jutting perspectival space, now inhabited by flatly painted images of highway overpasses, a jet wing, grain field, electric lines. Indications of the American industrial scene seem more related to the hand-painted, pristine look of Charles Sheeler than to the pop of, say, Roy Lichtenstein In form, there is also a reminiscence of field paintings in the simplicity and emblematic quality of these works. Now, as before, the main element in D'Arcangelo's pictures is the post-abstraction search for, as he put it, "icons that matter," monumental archetypes of the contemporary American expansive landscape highway.

Exhibitions

Solo exhibitions
1958
Allan D'Arcangelo: Oleos y Dibujos, Galeria Genova, Mexico City, August 1–19
 
1961
Allan D'Arcangelo, Long Island University Galleries, Brooklyn, November 8–December 1
 
1963
Fischbach Gallery, New York, April 30–May 25
 
1964
Fischbach Gallery, New York, February 25–March 21
 
1965
Ileana Sonnabend Gallery, Paris, January–February
Fischbach Gallery, New York, May–June
Gallery Müller, Stuttgart, Germany
Hans Neuendorf Gallery, Hamburg, Germany
 
1966
Dwan Gallery, Los Angeles, January 18–February 12
 
1967
Fischbach Gallery, New York, February 14–March 4
Galerie Ricke, Kassel, Germany, March 4–April 5
Obelisk Gallery, Boston, November 
Minami Gallery, Tokyo, November 22–December 9
Württembergischer Kunstverein, Stuttgart, Germany
 
1968
Allan D'Arcangelo: Recent Paintings, Franklin Siden Gallery, Detroit, February 13–March 9 
Lambert Gallery, Paris
 
1969
Allan D'Arcangelo, Gegenverkehr, Aachen, Germany, January 16–February 6 
Fischbach Gallery, New York, February 1–20
Franklin Siden Gallery, Detroit
 
1970
Obelisk Gallery, Boston, March
Skylite Gallery, Wisconsin State University, Eauclaire, September 16–October 6
 
1971
Allan D'Arcangelo, Paintings 1963–1970, Institute of Contemporary Art, University of Pennsylvania, Philadelphia, March 10–April 16; Albright-Knox Art Gallery, Buffalo, May 16–June 27; Museum of Contemporary Art, Chicago, July 10–September 5
Allan D'Arcangelo: Recent Work, Marlborough Gallery, November 6–30
 
1972
Allan D'Arcangelo: Recent Paintings and Works on Paper, Franklin Siden Gallery, Detroit, March 4–31
Elvejen Art Center, University of Wisconsin, Madison
 
1974
Schacht Fine Art Center, Russell Sage College, Troy, New York
Patricia Moore Gallery, Aspen, Colorado
Hokin Gallery, Chicago
 
1975
Recent Paintings by Allan D'Arcangelo, Marlborough Gallery, New York, January 11–February 1
Gallery Kingpitcher, Pittsburgh
 
1977
Allan D'Arcangelo, Drawings and Graphics, Contemporary Art Forms, Encino, California, October 7–28
Fiterman Gallery, Minneapolis
 
1978
D'Arcangelo, Paintings of the Early Sixties, Neuberger Museum, State University of New York at Purchase, June 6–September 10
 
1979
Allan D'Arcangelo, Institute of Contemporary Art of the Virginia Museum, Virginia Museum of Fine Arts, Richmond, May 8–July 1
 
1979–1980
The American Landscape, Paintings by Allan D'Arcangelo, Burchfield Center, Buffalo, May 6–August 31, 1979; Fort Lauderdale Museum of Art, November 7–25, 1979; University Art Gallery, State University of New York at Albany, January 22–February 29, 1980; Wichita Art Museum, Kansas, March 30–May 11, 1980; Olean Public Library, New York, June 10–July 8, 1980
 
1982
Allan D'Arcangelo: Paintings 1978–1982, Grace Borgenicht Gallery, New York, May 11–June 6
 
1984
Recent Paintings, Elizabeth Galasso Gallery, Ossining, New York
 
1991
Allan D'Arcangelo: Paintings, Jaffe Baker Gallery, Boca Raton, February–March
 
2000
Allan D'Arcangelo: The Pop Years, Beth Urdang Gallery, November 11–December 6
 
2005
Allan D'Arcangelo, Retrospettiva, Palazzina dei Giardini, Modena, January 23–March 28
 
2009
Allan D'Arcangelo: Paintings 1962–1982, Mitchell Innes & Nash, New York, April 2–May 2

2014
Beyond Pop: Allan D'Arcangelo, Hollis Taggart Galleries, New York, May 1–31
 
2017
Allan D'Arcangelo: Without Sound, 1974–1982, Garth Greenan Gallery, New York, April 18–June 3

2018
Allan D'Arcangelo: Pi in the Sky, Waddington Custot, London, UK, January 12-February 28

Group exhibitions

1958
Annual Exhibition, Mexican American Institute, Mexico City
 
1963
Landscape USA, Wilcox Gallery, Swarthmore College, Pennsylvania, February 9–March 5
Pop Art USA, Oakland Art Museum, California; California College of Arts and Crafts, September 7–29
The Popular Image, Institute of Contemporary Art, London, October 24–November 23
Mixed Media and Pop Art, Albright-Knox Art Gallery, Buffalo, November 19–December 15
Three Centuries of Popular Imagery, Des Moines Art Center, Iowa; Addison Gallery, Phillips Academy, Andover, Massachusetts
The Hard Center, Thibaut Gallery, New York
New Realism, University of Massachusetts, Amherst, Massachusetts
Popular Imagery, Sarah Lawrence College, New York
 
1963–1964
An American Viewpoint, Contemporary Art Center, Cincinnati, Ohio, December, 1963–January 7, 1964
Toys by Artists, Betty Parsons Gallery, New York, December 17, 1963 – January 4, 1964
 
1964
Sight and Sound, Cordier Ekstrom Gallery, New York, January 3–25
Nieuwe Realisten, Haags Gemeente Museum, The Hague, Netherlands, June 24–August 30; Akademie der Kunst, Berlin, Germany
Pop, Etc., Museum des 20 Jahrhunderts, Vienna, Austria, September 19–October 31
West Side Artists: New York City, Riverside Museum, New York, September 27–November 8 
Landscapes, Bryon Gallery, New York
American Landscape Painting, Museum of Modern Art, New York; Spoleto Festival, Italy
Boxes, Dwan Gallery, Los Angeles 
Anti-Sensitivity Art, Ohio University, Athens
Salon du Mai, Paris
 
1965
The Arena of Love, Dwan Gallery, Los Angeles, January 5–February 1 
Pop Art, Nouveau Realisme, Etc. ... , Palais des Beaux-Arts, Brussels, February 5–March 1 
The New American Realism, Worcester Art Museum, Massachusetts, February 18–April 4
Allan D'Arcangelo: Bilder und John Chamberlain: Plastiken, Galerie Rudolf Zwirner, March
Pop Art and the American Tradition, Milwaukee Arts Center, Wisconsin, April 9–May 9 
Northeastern Regional Exhibition of Art Across America, Institute of Contemporary Art, Boston, May 1–June 6
Self-Portraits, School of Visual Arts, New York
Pop Art Aus USA, Galerie Neuendorf, Hamburg, Germany
New Acquisitions, Larry Aldrich Museum, Ridgefield, Connecticut
Figuration in Contemporary Art, Greuze Gallery, Paris
Aspen Institute of Humanistic Studies, Colorado
Love and Kisses, Dwan Gallery, Los Angeles
 
1965–1966
Arakawa, Allan D'Arcangelo, Mark di Suervo, Robert Grosvenor, Anthony Magar, Neil Williams, Dwan Gallery, Los Angeles, December 21, 1965 – January 15, 1966
 
1965–1967
Pop and Op, Virginia Museum of Fine Arts, Richmond, 1965; American Federation of Arts Gallery, New York, 1966; Commercial Museum, Philadelphia Civic Center, Philadelphia, 1966; Baltimore Museum of Art, Baltimore, 1966; Everson Museum of Art, Syracuse, New York, 1966; Flint Institute of Arts, Michigan, 1966; William Rockhill Nelson Gallery of Art, Kansas City, Missouri, 1966; Isaac Delgado Museum of Art, New Orleans, 1966; Columbus Museum of Arts and Crafts, Columbus, Georgia, 1966; High Museum of Art, Atlanta, 1966; Cincinnati Art Museum, Ohio, 1966; California Palace of the Legion of Honor, San Francisco, 1967; Portland Art Museum, Oregon, 1967; Municipal Art Gallery, Los Angeles, 1967; Oklahoma Art Center, Oklahoma City, 1967; Munson-Williams-Proctor Institute, Utica, New York, 1967
 
1966
Contemporary Art USA, Norfolk Museum of Arts and Sciences, Virginia, March 18–April 10 
Conditional Commitment: The Artist's Terms, Upsala College, East Orange, New Jersey, March 25–April 10 
Games Without Rules, Fischbach Gallery, New York, March 29–April 16 
Critic's Choice, Long Beach Museum of Art, California, April 3–May 1
11 Pop Artists: The New Image, Galerie Friedrich-Dahlem, Munich, Germany; Galerie Neuendorf, Hamburg, Germany, April 24–May 31
The Harry M. Abrams Collection, Jewish Museum, New York, June 29–September 5 
Sculpture and Painting Today: Selections from the Collection of Susan Hilles, Museum of Fine Arts, Boston, October 7–November 6 
A National Small Painting Show, University of Omaha, November 7–30 
American Pop Artists, Galleria La Bertesca, Genova, Italy, November 12–December 10
Group Show, Pratt Center for Contemporary Printmaking, New York
Current Trends in American Art, Westmoreland County Museum of Art, Greensburg, Virginia
Graphics International, Phoenix Gallery, New York
Prints, AFA Gallery, New York
Landscapes, School of Visual Arts, New York
Writer's Conference, Long Island University, Brooklyn
 
1966–1967
The John G. Powers Collection, Larry Aldrich Museum, Ridgefield, Connecticut, September 25, 1966 – January 15, 1967 
The Watershed: Two Decades of American Painting, National Museum of Modern Art, Tokyo, October 15–November 27, 1966; Kyoto, December 10, 1966–January 22, 1967; National Gallery of Victoria, *Australia, 1967; Art Gallery of New South Wales, Australia, 1967; Lalit Kala Akademi, New Delhi, India, April 1967 
5th International Biennial of Prints, National Museum, Tokyo, December 4, 1966 – January 22, 1967 
New Forms, Stedelijk Museum, Amsterdam; Württembergischer Kunstverein, Stuttgart, Germany, 1966–1967; Kunsthalle, Bern, Switzerland, 1967
 
1966–1970
Americans Today, 25 Painters as Printmakers, Museum of Modern Art, New York, November 1–9; Abidjan, Ivory Coast, Africa, 1970
 
1967
Paintings: Studio 11, Württembergischer Kunstverein, Stuttgart, Germany, January 17–February 5 
Formen der Farbe, Stedelijk Museum, Amsterdam, February 17–March 26 
Original Pop Art, Städtische Kunstausstellung, Gelsenkirchen, Germany, March 5–May 20 
American Painting Now, Expo 67, American Pavilion, Montreal, Canada, April–October
Form, Color, Image, Detroit Institute of Arts, Michigan, April 11–May 21
Premio Internacional, Instituto Torcuato di Tella, Buenos Aires, Argentina, September–October
Transatlantic Graphics, Laing Art Gallery, Newcastle upon Tyne, September 30–October 21 
The 180 Beacon Collection of Contemporary Art, 180 Beacon Street, Boston, October 
Art on Paper, Weatherspoon Museum, Greensboro, North Carolina, October 15–November 22 
Protest and Hope, New School Art Center, New York, October 24–December 2 
Prints, Society of American Graphic Artists, New York
Environment USA: 1957–1967, IX Bienal de São Paulo, Brazil
Group Show, Vanderlip Gallery, Philadelphia
Highlights of the 1966–1967 Art Season, Larry Aldrich Museum, Ridgefield, Connecticut
American Painting Now, ACA Gallery, Boston
Contemporary Drawings, New York University
Director's Choice, Walker Art Center, Minneapolis, Minnesota
Pop Art Americana: D'Arcangelo, Dine, Kelly, Lichtenstein, Oldenburg, Phillips, Ramos, Rosenquist, Segal, Warhol, Wesley, Wesselman, Galleria De' Foscherari, Bologna, Italy
 
1967–1968
Frank O'Hara / In Memory of My Feelings, Museum of Modern Art, New York, December 5, 1967 – January 28, 1968
Annual Exhibition of Contemporary American Painting, Whitney Museum of American Art, New York, December 13, 1967 – February 4, 1968
American Painting Now, Horticultural Hall, Boston, December 15, 1967 – January 10, 1968
 
1968
American Paintings on the Market Today, Cincinnati Art Museum, Ohio, April 9–May 12 
L'Art Vivant 1965–1968, Fondation Maeght à St. Paul de Vence, France, April 13–June 30
Five Museums Come to Fordham University, Fordham University, New York, April 28–May 19 
Social Comment in America, Museum of Modern Art, New York; Museum of Art, Bowdoin College, Brunswick, Maine, June 13–July 7
Beyond Literalism: An Exhibition of Painting and Sculpture by Allan D'Arcangelo, Charles Fahlen, Jack Krueger, Naoto Nakagawa, Frank Roth, William Schwedler, William Wiley, Moore College of Art, *Philadelphia, October 4–November 2
Environment U.S.A.: 1957–1967, Rose Art Museum, Waltham, Massachusetts
1 Print, 1 Painting, School of Visual Art, New York
Exposicion International de Dibujo, Universidad de Puerto Rico, Mayaguez
Recent Directions in American Art, University of California at Riverside
Last Ten Years of Contemporary Art, Fordham University, New York
 
1968–1969
Querschnitt, Galerie Rickie, Lindenstraße, Germany, November 27, 1968 – January 7, 1969
 
1969
Toledo Collectors of Modern Art, Toledo Museum of Art, Ohio, March 9–April 6 
American Sculpture of the Sixties, Grand Rapids Art Museum, Michigan, March 22–May 24
Superlimited: Boxes, Books and Things, Jewish Theological Seminary of America, Jewish Museum, New York, April 16–June 29
New Acquisitions, Whitney Museum of American Art, New York, May 15–June 22 
Contemporary Art – Acquisitions, 1966–1969, Albright-Knox Art Gallery, Buffalo, June 17–September 1 
Painting for City Walls, Museum of Modern Art, New York, July 14–November 5
Ikonen der Verkehrskuitur, Kunstzentrum Gegenverkegr, Aachen, Germany
Critic's Choice 1968–69, New York State Council on the Arts and the State University of New York
 
1969–1970
American Drawings of the Sixties, A Selection, New School Art Center, New York, November 11, 1969 – January 10, 1970
 
1970
The Highway, University of Pennsylvania, Institute of Contemporary Art, Philadelphia, January 14–February 25; Houston Texas Institute for the Arts, Rice University, March 12–May 18; Akron Art Institute, Ohio, June 5–July 26 
American Prints Today, Munson-Williams-Proctor Institute, Utica, New York, January 18–February 22
Painting and Sculpture Today, Indianapolis Museum of Art, Indiana, April 21–June 1
Using Walls (Indoors), Jewish Theological Seminary of America, Jewish Museum, New York, May 13–June 21
Pop Art, Galerie de Gestlo, Hamburg, Germany, June 25–August 22 
Internationale der Zeichnung, Zeitgenossische Kunst, Darmstadt, Germany, August 15–November 11 
IV Bienal Americana de Grabado, Museo National de Bellas Artes, Santiago, Chile
Kunst der Sechziger Jahre, Wallraf-Richartz Museum, Cologne, Germany
XI Bienal De Arte Coltejer de Medellin, Colombia, South America
Exhibition of Paintings Eligible for the Childe Hassam Fund Purchase, American Academy of Arts and Letters, New York
American Painting: the 1960s, American Federation of Arts, New York
 
1971
20th-Century Painting & Sculpture from the New York University Art Collection, Hudson River Museum, Yonkers, New York, October 2–November 14
Collage of Indignation, Hundred Acres/Lower Gallery, New York, October 13–November 6
Inner Spaces/Outer Limits: Myths and Mythmakers, Lerner-Misrachi Gallery, New York, November 25–December 25
 
1971–1972
The Artist and the American Landscape, AM Sachs Gallery, New York, November 30, 1971 – January 5, 1972
 
1972
Art in Process, Finch College Museum of Art, New York, February
Painting and Sculpture Today 1972, Indianapolis Museum of Art, April 26–June 4
Bienal Americana des Artes Graficas, La Terulia Museum, Cali, Colombia
Group Show, Elvehjem Art Museum, Madison, Wisconsin
 
1973
Exhibition of Paintings Eligible for Childe Hassam Fund Purchase, American Academy of Arts and Letters, New York, November 9–December 16 
Contemporary Artists: Early and Late Paintings, Hamilton College, Root Art Center, Clinton, New York
List Art Posters, New School Art Center, New York
Group Show, National Academy of Design, New York
 
1973–1974
Hommage à Picasso, Kestner-Gessellschaft, Hannover, Germany, November 23, 1973 – January 13, 1974
 
1974
American Pop Art, Whitney Museum of American Art, New York, April 6–June 16
Contemporary American Painting from the Lewis Collection, Delaware Art Museum, Wilmington, Delaware, September 13–October 27 
II Bienal Americana de Artes Graficas, Museo La Tertulia, Cali, Colombia
 
1974–1975
Inaugural Exhibition, Hirshhorn Museum, Washington, D.C., October 4, 1974 – September 15, 1975
 
1975
Six Corporate Collectors: Western New York's New Art Patrons, Burchfield Center, Buffalo
Group Show, Dorsky Gallery, New York
Group Show, Marlborough-Goddard Gallery, Toronto
 
1975–1976
Images of an Era: The American Poster 1945–75, Corcoran Gallery of Art, Washington, D.C., November 21, 1975 – January 4, 1976; Contemporary Art Museum, Houston, February 2–March 19, 1976; Museum of Science and Industry, Chicago, April 1–May 2, 1976; Grey Art Gallery and Study Center, New York, May 22–June 31, 1976
 
1975–1977
American Art since 1945: from the Collection of the Museum of Modern Art, Worcester Art Museum, Massachusetts, October 22–November 30, 1975; Toledo Museum of Art, Ohio, January 11–February 22, 1976; Denver Art Museum, Colorado, March 22–May 2, 1976; Fine Arts Gallery of San Diego, May 31–July 11, 1976; Dallas Museum of Fine Arts, August 19–October 3, 1976; Joslyn Art Museum, Omaha, Nebraska, October 25–December 5, 1976; Greenville County Museum, South Carolina, January 10–February 20, 1977; Virginia Museum of Fine Arts, Richmond, March 14–April 17, 1977
 
1976
Urban Aesthetics, Queens Museum, New York, January 17–February 29
The 54th Exhibition of the Society of American Graphic Artists, Pratt Institute Graphics Center, New York, March 11–April 7 
Prints and Techniques: Selections from the New York University Collection, Grey Art Gallery and Study Center, New York University, April 1–May 5 
Works by Living American Artists: Western New York, Burchfield Center, Buffalo, May 9–June 27
Artists Celebrate the Bicentennial, National Museum Art Gallery, Singapore, May 25–June 11 
Bicentennial Banner Show, Hirshhorn Museum, Washington, D.C.
III Bienal Americana de Artes Graficas, La Tertulia Museum, Cali, Colombia, October
Exhibition of Paintings and Related Drawings, Charles Burchfield Center, Buffalo
New York 1976, Riksutallingar Museum, Stockholm, Sweden
Artists with Skowhegan, Boston Museum of Fine Art
Benefit Exhibit for Artists' Rights, Genesis Gallery, New York
Project Rebuild, Grey Art Gallery, New York University
 
1976–77
In Praise of Space – The Landscape in American Art, Corcoran Gallery of Art, Washington, D.C.
 
1977
Photonotations II, Rosa Esman Gallery, New York, May 3–June 4 
Brooklyn College Art Department: Past and Present, 1942–1977, Davis & Long Company, New York, and Robert Schoelkopf Gallery, New York, September 13–October 8 
Recent Gifts and Purchases, Guggenheim Museum of Art, New York, September 16–October 16
Invitational American Drawing Exhibition, Fine Arts Gallery, San Diego, September 17–October 30 
Fotos Aus Der Kunstszene New York, Kunstmuseum Düsseldorf, September 23–October 16 
Artists Salute Skowhegan, Kennedy Gallery, New York, December 8–21 
Contemporary American Art, Minneapolis Institute of Art, Minnesota
Arts for the Arts, Museum of Contemporary Crafts, New York
 
1977–1978
Inaugural Exhibition, Wichita Art Museum, Kansas, October 23, 1977 – January 15, 1978
Private Images: Photographs by Painters, Los Angeles County Museum, California, December 20, 1977 – March 5, 1978
 
1977–1979
55th National Traveling Print Exhibition, Society of American Graphic Artists, New York, October 1977–December 1979
 
1978
Art and the Automobile, Flint Institute of Arts, Michigan, January 12–March 12
Another Aspect of Pop Art, P.S. 1, Institute for Art and Urban Resources, Long Island City, New York, October 1–November 19
Small Scale Work, Ehrlich Gallery, New York
 
1979
Twenty-Fourth Annual Contemporary Painting Exhibition, Lehigh University, Bethlehem, Pennsylvania
Art Package, Highland Park, Illinois

1980
Printed Art: A View of Two Decades, Museum of Modern Art, New York, February 13–April 1
Contemporary Artists of Western New York, Permanent Collection Including New Acquisitions, Charles Burchfield Center, Buffalo, February 24–September 7
Annuals and Perennials: Latest Acquisitions and Others from the Permanent Collection, Charles Burchfield Center, Buffalo, June 22–September 28
 
1981
Annuals and Perennials II: Latest Acquisitions and Others from the Permanent Collection, Charles Burchfield Center, Buffalo, May 10–September 20
Cities and Villages: Drawings and Paintings by Western New York Artists, September 27–November 15
 
1982
Annuals and Perennials: New Acquisitions and Other Selections from the Permanent Collection, Charles Burchfield Center, June 27–September 26
 
1983
Spotlighting the Collection, Burchfield Art Center, March 27–May 11
 
1984
Autoscape: The Automobile in the American Landscape, Whitney Museum of American Art, Fairfield County, Connecticut, March 30–May 30 
33 Western New York Artists: Works from the Permanent Collection, Burchfield Art Center, Buffalo, July 22–September 23
Buffalo's Waterfront: A Tribute to James Carey Evans III, Burchfield Art Center, Buffalo, November 4–December 2
Night Lights, Dart Gallery, Chicago, November 16–December 11
 
1984–1985
Automobile and Culture, Museum of Contemporary Art, Los Angeles, July 21, 1984 – January 6, 1985
 
1985
Detroit Style, Automotive Form, 1925–1950, Detroit Institute of Arts, Michigan, June 12–September 8
A Toast to the N.E.A.: Works by Western New York Artists, Charles Burchfield Art Center, Buffalo
 
1985–1986
Inaugural Exhibition for the Frances and Sydney Lewis Wing, Virginia Museum of Fine Arts, Richmond, December 4, 1985 – January 26, 1986
 
1986
Art from the City University of New York: Approaches to Abstraction, Shanghai Exhibition Hall, China, November
 
1986–1987
Pop Art and Image: The Artists' Choice, Art Train Exhibition (nationwide tour)
 
1987
Made in the USA: Art from the 50s and 60s, University Art Museum, Berkeley, California, April 4–June 21; Nelson-Atkins Museum of Art, Kansas City, July 25–September 6; Virginia Museum of Fine Arts, Richmond, October 7–December 7 
American Pop Art, Dorsky Gallery, New York, May 5–June 6 
The Artful Traveller, B.M.W. Gallery, New York, July–October 31 
Pop Art USA-UK: American and British Artists of the 60s and 80s, Odakyu Grand Gallery, Tokyo, July 24–August 18, 1987; Dalmaru Museum, Osaka; Funabashi Selbu Museum of Art, Funabashi; Sogo Museum of Art, Yokohama 
Dallas Pop Art Americana alla Nuova Figurazione, Padiglione d'Arte Contemporanea, Milan, September 23–November 23
 
1988–1989
Drive!, B.M.W. Gallery, New York, October 1988–March 1989
 
1990
Pop on Paper, James Goodman Gallery, New York, May 4–June 15
 
1991
Pop Art, Royal Academy of Arts, London, September 13, 1991 – December 15, 1991
 
1994–1995
The Prints of Roy Lichtenstein, National Gallery of Art, Washington, D.C., October 30, 1994 – January 8, 1995; Los Angeles County Museum of Art, February 16–April 30, 1995; Dalls Museum of Art, May 28–August 6, 1995
 
1997
The Great American Pop Art Store: Multiples of the Sixties, University Art Museum, California State University, Long Beach, August 26–October 26
The Pop '60s: Transatlantic Crossing, Centro Cultural de Belém, Lisbon, September 11–November 17
 
1997–2002
Buffalo's Grain Elevators, Burchfield Penney Art Center, Buffalo, April 19–June 1; Kenan Center, Lockport, New York, September 10–October 8; Western New York Public Broadcasting Association, Horizons Plaza, Buffalo, December 10, 2001 – February 1, 2002
 
1998
Masters of the Masters: MFA Faculty of the School of Visual Arts New York 1983–1998, Butler Institute of American Art, Youngstown, Ohio, April 4–May 17
 
1998–1999
Pop Art: Selection from the Museum of Modern Art, High Museum of Art, Atlanta, October 24, 1998 – January 17, 1999
 
1999
Pop Impressions Europe/USA: Print and Multiples from the Museum of Modern Art, Museum of Modern Art, New York, February 18–May 18
Sites/Sights of Passage: Art of the New Jersey Turnpike, James Howe Fine Arts Gallery, Kean University, October 4–November 5
 
2001
Pop Art: U.S./U.K. Connections, 1956/1966, The Menil Collection, Houston, January 26–May 23
 
2004
Pop Classics, ARoS Aarhus Kunstmuseum, Denmark, May 28–September 5
 
2007
Pop Art at Princeton: Permanent and Promised, Princeton University Art Museum, New Jersey, March 24–August 12
 
2012–2013
Sinister Pop, Whitney Museum of American Art, New York, November 15, 2012 – March 31, 2013
 
2012–2016
Pop Art Design, Vitra Design Museum, Weil am Rhein, Germany, October 13, 2012 – March 3, 2013; Louisiana Museum of Modern Art, Humlebaek, Denmark, February 21–June 9, 2013; Moderna Museet, Stockholm, Sweden, June 27–September 9, 2013; Barbican Art Gallery, London, October 18, 2013 – February 9, 2014; Emma Espoo, Finland, February 17–May 10, 2015; Henie-Ostad Kunstenter, Hovikodden, Norway, May 28–August 30, 2015; Museum of Contemporary Art, Chicago, December 19, 2015 – March 27, 2016
 
2014
Bridging the Great Divide: Landscape From Tradition to New Media, Burchfield Penney Art Center, February 14–June 1
 
2015
America Is Hard to See, Whitney Museum of American Art, New York, May 1–September 27
 
2016–2017
From the Collection: 1960–1969, Museum of Modern Art, New York, March 26, 2016 – March 12, 2017
Human Interest: Portraits from the Whitney's Collection, Whitney Museum of American Art, New York, April 6, 2016 – February 12, 2017
 
2017
Pop 'n' Op, Asheville Art Museum, North Carolina, March 18–May 14

Collections

D'Arcangelo's work is found in the permanent collections of major museums and other public institutions worldwide.

Albright-Knox Art Gallery, Buffalo
Allentown Art Museum, Pennsylvania
Anderson Gallery, University of Buffalo, New York
Art Institute of Chicago
Asheville Art Museum, North Carolina
Boca Raton Museum of Art, Florida
Brooklyn Museum
Burchfield-Penney Art Center, Buffalo, New York
Butler Institute of American Art, Youngstown, Ohio
Canton Museum of Art, Ohio
Casa Cavazzini, Museum of Modern Art, Udine, Italy
Centre Pompidou, Paris
Chazen Museum of Art, University of Wisconsin-Madison
Contemporary Art Museum of Macedonia, Skopje, Macedonia
Currier Museum of Art, New Hampshire
Dallas Museum of Art
Denver Art Museum
Detroit Institute of Arts
De Young Museum, San Francisco
Fine Arts Collection, Luther College, Decorah, Iowa
Fogg Museum, Harvard University, Cambridge, Massachusetts 
Fred Jones Jr. Museum of Art, University of Oklahoma, Norman
Gemeentemuseum Den Haag, The Hague, Netherlands
Georgia Museum of Art, University of Georgia, Athens
Godwin-Ternbach Museum, Queens College, City University of New York
Governor Nelson A. Rockefeller Empire State Plaza Art Collection, Albany, New York
Grey Art Gallery, New York University
Hirshhorn Museum and Sculpture Garden, Washington, D.C.
Indianapolis Museum of Art, Indiana
Kunstmuseum Gelsenkirchen, Gelsenkirchen-Buer, Germany
Massachusetts Institute of Technology, Cambridge, Massachusetts
Metropolitan Museum of Art, New York
Minneapolis Institute of Art
Museum Ludwig, Cologne
Museum of Art and Archaeology, University of Missouri, Columbia 
Museum of Modern Art, New York
National Gallery of Art, Washington, D.C.
National Gallery of Australia, Canberra
National Gallery of Victoria, Melbourne, Australia
New Jersey State Museum, Trenton
New Orleans Museum of Art
Niigata Prefectural Museum of Modern Art, Nagaoka, Japan
Pensacola Museum of Art, University of West Florida
Pomona College Museum of Art, Claremont, California
Rose Art Museum, Brandeis University, Waltham, Massachusetts
Royal Museums of Fine Arts of Belgium, Brussels
Smithsonian American Art Museum, Washington, D.C.
Solomon R. Guggenheim Museum, New York City
Tate Modern, London
Virginia Museum of Fine Arts, Richmond
Wadsworth Atheneum, Hartford, Connecticut
Walker Art Center, Minneapolis
Weatherspoon Art Museum, Greensboro, North Carolina
Weisman Art Museum, University of Minnesota, Minneapolis
Whitney Museum of American Art, New York City
Wichita Art Museum, Kansas

See also
Abstract Illusionism
Pop Art
Hard-edge painting

References

External links
Allan D'Arcangelo at Garth Greenan Gallery
Estate of Allan D'Arcangelo
Allan D'Arcangelo in the National Gallery of Australia's Kenneth Tyler Collection

1930 births
1998 deaths
20th-century American painters
American male painters
Modern painters
American pop artists
20th-century American printmakers
Artists from Buffalo, New York
Brooklyn College faculty
Mexico City College alumni
University at Buffalo alumni
American people of Italian descent
20th-century American male artists